Anthony John Walton (24 October 1934 – 2 March 2022) was a British set and costume designer. He won three Tony Awards for his work on Pippin (1973), House of Blue Leaves (1986), and Guys and Dolls (1992). For his work in movies he won an Oscar, for All That Jazz (1979), and for his work in television he won an Emmy, for the 1985 TV version of Death of a Salesman.

In addition he received three more Academy Award nominations for his work in Mary Poppins (1964), Murder on the Orient Express (1974),  and The Wiz (1978).

Early life
Walton was born in Walton-on-Thames, Surrey, England, on 24 October 1934. His father, Lancelot, was an orthopedic surgeon and his mother, Hilda, was a homemaker.  He fell in love with the theatre as child when on a family trip to a pantomime.  At the age of 12, he met Julie Andrews after he had watched her in a performance of Humpty Dumpty in the West End. She was 11 at the time. He found her number in the telephone book and asked for her address so he could send her some pictures. The two became good friends from this point. 

Walton attended Radley College in Oxford where he studied Greek and Latin. Here he put on some ambitious marionette shows, one of which was attended by the English artist John Piper. He came to find Walton at the end of the show, and told him he should go into stage design.  Walton followed his advice and studied at the Slade School of Fine Art in London. He spent two years of mandatory military training with the Royal Air Force, as a trainee pilot in Ontario, Canada. After completing his National Service, he headed to New York to join Julie Andrews, who was making a name for herself on Broadway.

Career
He began his career in 1957 with the stage design for Noël Coward's off-Broadway production of Conversation Piece. Throughout the late 1950s and early 1960s, he designed for the New York and London stage. 

Walton entered the motion pictures business through Walt Disney, after Disney met him back stage after a performance of Camelot. Julie Andrews, who was now his fiancé, was already in line to play the part of Mary Poppins in the classic film. Disney offered to look at his portfolio and later ended up hiring Walton as a costume designer, set designer, and visual consultant for Mary Poppins. He was not allowed to make any reference to the famous illustrations that Mary Shephard had done for the original book in 1934, as the rights to the story did not include this. The Sherman brothers, who were working on the songs for the movie, suggested that he transposed the era of the story from the 1930s to the Edwardian era, to ensure he avoided any accidental replications.  He made the set realistic, paying attention to detail, as he was always annoyed by sets that didn't look real. He also alluded to Mary Poppins' "secret life", by making her clothes grey or black on the outside, but with brightly coloured linings and flashes of crimson.  For this he received an Academy Award nomination for Best Costume Design (Color). Walton won his only Academy Award for his work (with others) as Art Director on Bob Fosse's musical film All That Jazz.

In 1983, Diana Ross, the star of the film The Wiz, chose Walton to design the stage set for her 1983 Central Park concert, "For One & For All". Broadcast worldwide on the Showtime cable network, the concert special, over the course of two days, featured an on-site audience of over 1,200,000 on the park's Great Lawn.

In 1989, the American Museum of the Moving Image showcased over 30 years of his work for films, television, and theatre in an exhibit entitled: Tony Walton: Designing for Stage and Screen, including drawings, models and photographs from his early plays including the Regency-style Conversation Piece from 1957 and "his evocation of a London street" for the 1964 film Mary Poppins.

In December 2005, for their annual birthday celebration to 'The Master', The Noël Coward Society invited Walton as the guest celebrity to lay flowers in front of Coward's statue at New York's Gershwin Theatre, thereby commemorating the 106th birthday of Sir Noël.

 Inspiration for Disney's Winnie the Pooh 

Walton gave the Sherman Brothers the insight and inspiration for the Winnie the Pooh and the Honey Tree songs as is explained in the Sherman Brothers' joint autobiography, Walt's Time:

Personal life and death
Walton married his childhood sweetheart Julie Andrews in 1959, and together they had a daughter, Emma Walton Hamilton. Walton said that he fell in love with Andrews when they were children and he saw her playing the egg in a theatre production of Humpty Dumpty. They divorced in 1968 but remained close friends.

Walton married Gen LeRoy in 1991. Walton, Andrews and their daughter worked together professionally several times. He illustrated several children's books written by Andrews and their daughter. Walton died from complications of a stroke at his apartment in New York City on 2 March 2022, at the age of 87.

Credits

Film

Television

Theatre 

Walton later diversified into directing, with productions of:
Orson Welles' Moby Dick—Rehearsed, 2005
Oscar Wilde's The Importance of Being Earnest, 1996
Noël Coward In Two Keys, 1996
George Bernard Shaw's Major Barbara, 1997
 Missing Footage, 1999
Ooops! The Big Apple Circus Stage Show, 1999
Where's Charley?, 2004
After the Ball, 2004
Busker Alley, 2006

Awards and nominations

Academy Awards

Emmy Awards

Tony Awards

References

External links

Yahoo! Movies profile of Tony Walton
A Tale of Two Cities
Profile for A Tale of Two Cities
Tony Walton costume design reproductions for The Wiz, 1978., held by the Billy Rose Theatre Division, New York Public Library for the Performing Arts

1934 births
2022 deaths
Alumni of the Slade School of Fine Art
Best Art Direction Academy Award winners
British costume designers
Broadway set designers
English scenic designers
People educated at Radley College
People from Walton-on-Thames
Tony Award winners